Mga Kuwento ni Lola Basyang is a 2007 Philippine television drama fantasy anthology broadcast by GMA Network. Starring Manilyn Reynes and Paul Salas, it premiered on February 4, 2007. The show concluded on August 12, 2007 with a total of 26 episodes.

The series is streaming online on YouTube.

Overview

The show is a program designed specifically to appeal to children. It is a weekly anthology aimed at entertaining children through a retelling of Severino Reyes' classic folktales and seeks to rekindle their interest in the richness of Filipino literature. All the episodes featured live-action twist adaptations of Pinoy folktales in costume by many well-known actors, teleplays by Gina Marissa Tagasa, Agnes de Guzman, Dinno Erece and Adrian Ho, and are directed by Argel Joseph and Don Michael Perez.

Mga Kuwento ni Lola Basyang is a series of short stories written by "Lola Basyang", pen name of Severino Reyes, founder and editor of the Tagalog magazine Liwayway. The original magazine stories have been adapted several times for comics, television, film, and published in book form. GMA Network bought the rights for the TV serialization of Mga Kuwento ni Lola Basyang.

The show gives a fresh take to the traditional rocking chair storytelling by introducing a younger character who will continue the legacy of Lola Basyang. Gervacia Zamora Reyes also known as Herbie (played by Manilyn Reynes)—Lola Basyang's compassionately strong-willed and high-spirited granddaughter who has made it her personal advocacy to disseminate Lola Basyang's stories. Together with her eight-year-old son Efren (Paul Salas) and their dog pet Pitik, she drives around in a "rolling library" van packed with Lola Basyang's books and goes to various places to spread Lola Basyang's classic tales and golden values.

Episodes

Season 1
 Ang Mahiwagang kuba (The Enchanted Hunchback)
 Ang Prinsipeng Unggoy (The Monkey Prince)
 Ang Parusa ng Duwende (The Dwarf's Punishment)
 Ang Binibining Tumalo sa Mahal Datu (The Maiden Who Defeated the Datu)
 Ang Mahiwagang Biyulin (The Enchanted Violin)
 Ang Prinsipeng Mahaba ang Ilong (The Prince with A Long Nose)
 Ang Sumpa ng Higanteng si Amok (The Curse of Amok the Giant)
 Ang Walong Bulag (The Eight Blind Men)
 Ang Prinsipeng Duwag (The Cowardly Prince)
 Akong Ikit
 Maria Alimango
 Si Sultan Saif (Sultan Saif)
 Ang Prinsipe ng mga Ibon (prince of the birds)

Season 2
 Si Pedrong Walang Takot (Fearless Pedro)
 Ang Gwapong Sastre (The Handsome Tailor)
 Ang Palasyo ng mga Duwende (The Palace of the Dwarves)
 Ang Kapatid ng Tatlong Maria (The Brother of the Three Marias)
 Ang Hukbo ni Padre Pedro (The Legion of Father Pedro)
 Ang Plautin ni Periking (The Flute of Periking)
 Anting-anting (The Amulet)
 Ang Mahiwagang Balabal (The Enchanted Cape)
 Ang Dragon sa Ilog Lingwa (The Dragon in Lingwa River)
 Pandakotyong
 Ang Kastilyong Bakal (The Iron-made Palace)
 Prinsesang Kalbo (The Bald Princess)
 Ang Pitong Hilo (The Seven Idiots)

Accolades

References

External links
 

2007 Philippine television series debuts
2007 Philippine television series endings
Filipino-language television shows
GMA Network original programming
Philippine anthology television series